This is a list of the number-one songs of 2015 in Mexico. The airplay chart rankings are published by Monitor Latino, based on airplay across radio stations in Mexico using the Radio Tracking Data, LLC in real time. Charts are ranked from Monday to Sunday. Besides the General chart, Monitor Latino also publishes "Pop", "Popular" (Regional Mexican) and "Anglo" charts.

The streaming charts are published weekly by AMPROFON (Asociación Mexicana de Productores de Fonogramas y Videogramas).

Chart history (Airplay)
Monitor Latino provides two lists for each chart: the "Audience" list ranks the songs according to the estimated number of people that listened to them on the radio during the week. The "Tocadas" (Spins) list ranks the songs according to the number of times they were played on the radio during the week.

General

Pop

Popular

Anglo

Chart history (Streaming)

See also
List of Top 20 songs for 2015 in Mexico
List of number-one albums of 2015 (Mexico)

References

2015
Number-one songs
Mexico